Vladislav Kozhemyakin may refer to:

 Vladislav Kozhemyakin (footballer, born 1983), Russian football player
 Vladislav Kozhemyakin (footballer, born 2001), Russian football player